Chignik Bay Seaplane Base  is a public-use seaplane base serving Chignik, a city in the Lake and Peninsula Borough of the U.S. state of Alaska.

Facilities and aircraft 
Chignik Bay Seaplane Base has two seaplane landing areas: the E/W waterway is 6,000 by 4,000 feet (1,829 x 1,219 m) and the NE/SW waterway is 10,000 by 4,000 feet (3,048 x 1,219 m). The beach is used for aircraft pull-up. For the 12-month period ending December 31, 2006, the airport had 210 aircraft operations, an average of 17 per month: 95% general aviation and 5% air taxi.

See also 
 Chignik Airport 
 Chignik Fisheries Airport 
 Chignik Lagoon Airport 
 Chignik Lake Airport

References

External links 
 Diagram for Chignik Bay Seaplane Base (Z78) (GIF). FAA, Alaska Region. 25 Dec 2003.

Airports in Lake and Peninsula Borough, Alaska
Seaplane bases in Alaska